Fashola is a Nigerian surname of Yoruba origin. Notable people with the surname include:

Babatunde Fashola (born 1963), 13th Governor of Lagos State and current Minister of Works & Housing in Nigeria
Abimbola Fashola (born 1965), wife of Babatunde Fashola
Azeez Adeshina Fashola (born 1991), Nigerian singer and songwriter known by the stage name Naira Marley

Yoruba-language surnames